The First Chapter is the first studio album by Nastyboy Klick. It was released on August 5, 1997.

MC Magic, founder of Nasty Boy Klick, was discovered in the summer of 1996 by radio personality, Kid Corona.

After a brief meeting with Magic, Corona decided to take a chance and play “Lost in Love” on his Tucson radio show. The song was an instant hit, and the phone lines went wild!

At first, Corona had gotten in trouble for playing an unknown song on the air. But, he was quickly forgiven due to the insane amount of requests. As a result of the songs success, MC Magic invited Kid Corona to appear as himself on their hit song “AZ Side.”

Track listing
 Intro 
 Down for Yours
 Az Side
 Keep It Bumpin
 Life
 Bookies Freestyle 
 Temptation 
 Summertime
 How Many M.C.'s
 Theresomethin 
 Constantly
 Get Yo Back Up Off the Wall

References

1997 debut albums
NB Ridaz albums